Rabbi Ezekiel Isidore Epstein (יחזקא-ל יצחק אפשטיין ;1894-1962)
 

was an Orthodox rabbi and rabbinical scholar in England. He is best known as Editor of the first complete English translation of the Babylonian Talmud, and for his role as Principal of Jews' College, London. He was also the author of numerous scholarly and popular books on Judaism.

Biography
Epstein was born in Kovno, Lithuania on 7 May 1893. His father was David Epstein, a bootmaker and his mother was Malka Epstein. Both parents were Orthodox Jews. The family moved to Paris when he was very young, and in 1903, they moved to London. There, he attended Old Castle Street School, and Raine's Foundation School. 

At the age of fifteen, he studied Talmud at Great Garden Street's beit midrash. Due to the quality of his work, he was sent to study at the Pressburg Yeshiva under Rabbi Akiva Sofer. 
(He had also studied in Paris under Rabbi Zadoc Kahn, chief rabbi of France.)
He received semikhah (ordination) from Rabbi Isaiah Silberstein of Vác, and subsequently from Rabbi Yisrael Chaim Daiches of Leeds, and from Rabbi Abraham Isaac Kook, while the latter was based in London during World War I. 

He was advised by chief rabbi Joseph Hertz to obtain an academic education. 
He studied at the University of London, earning a First Class BA Honours degree in Semitic languages, followed by two doctorates, the PhD and the DLit. 

He served as rabbi of Middlesbrough Hebrew Congregation  (1920-1928), following which he joined the teaching staff of Jews' College, London. In 1945 he was appointed Director of Studies and subsequently Principal. 

He retired in 1961.

Epstein married twice: he married his first wife Jeanie in Belfast in 1921 and the couple had two children, Rachel and Leon. However, she died in 1924, and Epstein remarried 3 June 1925. With his second wife, Gertrude, Isidore had a third child on 13 April 1926: Samuel Stanley Epstein, who died in 13 March 2018. Rabbi Epstein died on 13 April 1962.

Works
Rabbi Epstein is best known for serving as Editor of the first complete English translation of the Babylonian Talmud, published by the Soncino Press (London, 35 volumes, 1935-1952); 

see . 
He recruited many rabbis and scholars for the massive project, personally reviewing all of the work as it was produced, and co-ordinating the many details of notation and transliteration of Hebrew words.

Epstein was also an editor of Joseph H. Hertz' Pentateuch and Haftorahs (1929–1936), and editor of a collection of papers (published 1935) in connection with the eighth centenary of the birth of Maimonides ( 1135). 
He was also the author of numerous scholarly and popular books relating to Judaism.

His publications include:
 'The Responsa of Rabbi Simon B. Zemah Duran As a Source of the History of the Jews in North Africa' (Oxford University Press, 1930)
 Ed., 'Moses Maimonides: Anglo-Jewish Papers in Connection with the Eighth Centenary of His Birth' (London, 1935)
 'Judaism' (London, The Epworth Press, 1939)
 'Social legislation in the Talmud' (Torah Va'Avodah Library, Ideological Series) (Tnuath Torah Va'Avodah, 1943)
 'Man and his creator: A guide-book for teachers' (Jewish Educational Publications) (London, Woburn House, 1944)
 Ed., 'Joseph Herman Hertz, 1872-1946, in Memoriam' (London, Soncino Press, 1947)
 'The Jewish Way of Life' (Edward Goldston, 1947)
 'The Faith of Judaism: an interpretation for our times' (London, Soncino Press, 1954)
 'Step By Step in the Jewish Religion' (London, Soncino Press, 1958)
 'Judaism: A Historical Presentation' (Penguin, 1950s, many subsequent editions)
 'The faith of Judaism;: An interpretation for our times' (London, Soncino Press, 1960)
 'Step by Step in the Jewish Religion' (London, Soncino Press, 1965)

References

British Orthodox rabbis
1894 births
1962 deaths
Academics of the London School of Jewish Studies
Writers from Kaunas
Lithuanian Jews
Lithuanian emigrants to the United Kingdom